Wyeth is an unincorporated community in Andrew County, in the U.S. state of Missouri.

The community is on Missouri Route C approximately 1.5 miles southeast of Rosendale. The One Hundred and Two River flows past about one-half mile to the west.

History
An old variant name was Rush, after Peter Rush, a local landowner. A post office called Rush was established in 1890, the name was changed into Wyeth in 1904, and the post office closed in 1905.

References

Unincorporated communities in Andrew County, Missouri
Unincorporated communities in Missouri